Brothers Blue (Italian: Blu Gang - E vissero per sempre felici e ammazzati) is a 1973 Italian Spaghetti Western film directed by Luigi Bazzoni. For this film Tony Renis won the Nastro d'Argento for Best Score.

Plot 
The Blue brothers (Kane, Johnny and Frank) try to lead a free and independent life by robbing banks. They are pursued by a local sheriff Hillmann, who tries in vain to capture them. When the brothers finally get enough money, their life turns up into bright and rather dangerous adventure.

Cast 
 Guido Mannari as Johnny Blue
 Tina Aumont as Polly Clay
 Jack Palance as Captain Hillman
 Antonio Falsi as Kane Blue
 Maurizio Bonuglia as Frank Blue
 Paul Jabara as Teddy Fog
 Guido Lollobrigida as Sheriff (as Lee Burton)
 Maria Michi as Mutter Blue

References

External links

1973 films
Films directed by Luigi Bazzoni
Spaghetti Western films
1973 Western (genre) films
1970s Italian films